Basoda Assembly constituency is one of the 230 Vidhan Sabha (Legislative Assembly) constituencies of Madhya Pradesh state in central India. This constituency came into existence in 1962, as one of the Vidhan Sabha constituencies of Madhya Pradesh state.

Overview
Basoda (constituency number 145) is one of the 5 Vidhan Sabha constituencies located in Vidisha district. This constituency presently covers some of the Basoda tehsil's villages of the district with 98, Gyaraspur tehsil's 132 villages and Tyonda tehsil's 104 villages. It has total 232 polling booths. Total Voters in the constituency are 1,78,486.

Basoda is part of Vidisha Lok Sabha constituency along with seven other Vidhan Sabha segments namely Vidisha in vidisha district; Bhojpur, Sanchi and Silwani in Raisen district; Budhni, Ichhawar in Sehore District; Khategaon in Dewas district.

Members of Legislative Assembly

Election Results

2013 results

References

Vidisha district
Assembly constituencies of Madhya Pradesh